The United Kingdom conducted 12 major nuclear weapons tests in Australia between 1952 and 1957. These explosions occurred at the Montebello Islands, Emu Field and Maralinga.

Sites

The British conducted testing in the Pacific Ocean at Malden Island and Kiritimati known at the time as Christmas Island (not to be confused with Christmas Island in the Indian Ocean) between 1957 and 1958.  These were airbursts mostly occurring over water or suspended a few hundred metres above the ground by balloon.

In Australia there were three sites.  Testing was carried out between 1952 and 1957 and was mostly done at the surface.  A few hundred smaller scale tests were conducted at both Emu Field and Maralinga between 1953 and 1963.

Monte Bello Islands
Two separate atomic test projects occurred at the islands, the first being Operation Hurricane and the second being Operation Mosaic. Following the second Mosaic explosion, the radioactive cloud that was supposed to be taken away from the site, was sent back by wind that was not anticipated by the British scientists.

Emu Field
The atomic tests at Emu Field in 1953 were known as Operation Totem. The test site of Emu Field was abandoned just hours after the second and final test, Totem 2.

Maralinga

A testing site at Maralinga was established in 1955, close to a siding along the Trans-Australian Railway. Because supplies could be brought to the site via rail, it was preferred over Emu Field. A total of seven major tests were conducted at Maralinga.  Both the Federal government and Australian newspapers at the time were very supportive of the tests. In 1952, the Liberal Government passed legislation, the Defence (Special Undertakings) Act 1952, which allowed the British Government access to remote parts of Australia to undertake atmospheric nuclear weapons tests. The general public were largely unaware of the risks from the testing program, stemming from official secrecy about the testing program and the remote locations of the test sites.

Before the tests could begin the Maralinga Tjarutja, the traditional Aboriginal owners of the land, were forcibly removed.

An air base at Woomera, 570 km away, which had been used for rocket testing, was initially used as a base from which planes were flown for testing of the bomb clouds.

According to Liz Tynan from James Cook University, the Maralinga tests were a striking example of extreme secrecy, but by the late 1970s there was a marked change in how the Australian media covered the British nuclear tests. Avon Hudson, an atomic veteran who participated as an Australian serviceman during the later stage Minor Trials became a prominent whistleblower. Some resourceful investigative journalists emerged and political scrutiny became more intense. In June 1993, New Scientist journalist Ian Anderson wrote an article entitled "Britain's dirty deeds at Maralinga" and several related articles.

Minor Trials
Over a decade, 1953 to 1963, a series of "Minor Trials" occurred testing components of the Atomic and Hydrogen Bombs using in some instances radioactive and toxic materials, such as Plutonium, Beryllium, and  Uranium. Most of the minor trials involved conventional explosions to map out the radioactive dispersion and contamination of military assets, building structures and early crash test dummies. The Minor Trial of Vixen A dispersing Plutonium over a wide area by conventional explosive was considered to have had the longest half-life of any test or trial conducted in Australia.

Opposition
Opposition to the tests grew throughout the 1950s. A poll in 1957 found that almost half the population was against them.

Documentation
Several books have been written about nuclear weapons testing in Australia.  These include Britain, Australia and the Bomb, Maralinga: Australia's Nuclear Waste Cover-up and My Australian Story: Atomic Testing: The Diary of Anthony Brown, Woomera, 1953. In 2006 Wakefield Press published Beyond belief: the British bomb tests: Australia's veterans speak out by Roger Cross and veteran and whistleblower, Avon Hudson.

See also

 Downwinders
 Kevin Buzzacott
 List of books about nuclear issues
 McClelland Royal Commission
 Silent Storm (film)

References

External links
 Australian government database of nuclear explosions and tests
 Australian Radiation Protection and Nuclear Safety Agency (ARPANSA)  report at Nuclear Files ( ARPANSA have no longer hosted a copy of their own report since 2013)
 Australia's program of testing for Strontium 90, between 1957 and 1978, samples of children's bones taken at autopsy
 Ionising Radiation and Health

 
Environmental issues in Australia
Environmental disasters in Australia
Australia–United Kingdom relations